Mon Repos or Monrepos (from the French for "my rest") is an extensive English landscape park in the northern part of the rocky island of Linnasaari (Tverdysh, Slottsholmen) outside Vyborg, Russia.

The manor of Monrepos was established by Baron Ludwig Heinrich von Nicolay who bought this parcel of land in 1788. The estate was considered a jewel of Old Finland and belonged to his descendants until the Soviet takeover in 1944. The core of the baronial estate consists of the Neoclassical main house (designed by Giuseppe Antonio Martinelli) (today derelict) and the library house.

The seaside park is strewn with glacially deposited boulders, scenic cliffs and wooden pavilions. It is considered a landmark in the evolution of the Romantic taste for landscape gardening. The mausoleum of Baron Nicolay was designed by Pietro Gonzago and frescoed by Johann Jacob Mettenleiter.

Ludwig Heinrich's only son and successor, Baron Paul von Nicolay, was the Russian ambassador in Copenhagen from 1816 to 1847. His wife Alexandrine Simplicie de Broglie (the 2nd Duke's granddaughter) commissioned from Charles Heathcote Tatham an obelisk commemorating her brothers slain in the Napoleonic wars. Auguste de Montferrand, Andreas Shtakenshneider and Gotthelf Borup also designed pavilions and statuary for Monrepos.

Some 50 species of plants can be found, some of them being rare. Its fauna is diverse as well.

Further reading 
 Ludwig Heinrich von Nicolay, Das Landgut Monrepos in Finnland, (1804), Faksimile der Ausgabe 1840, (1995), herausgegeben von der Pückler-Gesellschaft e.V., Berlin
 Renée Elton Maud, One Year at the Russian Court: 1904–1905, (1918), John Lane, London
 Edmund Heier, L. H. Nicolay (1737–1820) and his contemporaries, (1965), Martinus Nijhoff, The Hague
 Paul Gundersen, Paul Nicolay of Monrepos – a European with a difference, (2003), Näkymä, Publishers, Helsinki
 Rainer Knapas, Monrepos, Ludwig Heinrich Nicolay och hans värld i 1700-talets ryska Finland, (2003), Atlantis, Stockholm
 Rainer Knapas, Monrepos, une arcadie des lumières, Saint-Pétersbourg, Vyborg, Helsinki, (2008), Société de Littérature Finnoise, Helsinki

External links 
 
 Official site of Mon Repos park

Parks in Russia
Museums in Vyborg
Auguste de Montferrand buildings and structures
Historic house museums in Russia
Continental gardens in the English Landscape Garden style
Cultural heritage monuments of federal significance in Leningrad Oblast